Autopistas Metropolitanas de Puerto Rico, LLC  stylized as metropistas  is the public–private partnership, privately held company, and limited liability company that operates  PR-5 and PR-22 on behalf of the Puerto Rico Highways and Transportation Authority. The company is a consortium between Goldman Sachs and Abertis where Goldman Sachs initially served as majority owner through its Goldman Sachs Infrastructure Partners II infrastructure fund, while Abertis initially served as minority partner and main operator. However, in February 2013 Abertis acquired 6% of Goldman Sach's equity, elevating its position as majority owner with 51% ownership.

In late 2018 it was given a BBB rating by Kroll Bond Rating Agency (KBRA) and has a Concession Agreement with the Puerto Rico Highway Transportation Authority for Puerto Rico Highway 5 and Puerto Rico Highway 22.

See also
 List of highways in Puerto Rico

Notes

References

External links
  

Highways in Puerto Rico
Public–private partnerships in Puerto Rico